Barry Reay (born 17 January 1950), now retired, was formerly professor of history at the University of Auckland, New Zealand. He is a specialist in the history of sex and gender.

Selected publications

Edited
 Radical Religion in the English Revolution, Oxford University Press, 1984. (With J. F. McGregor) 
 Popular Culture in Seventeenth-Century England, St. Martin's, 1985.
 Sexualities in History: A Reader, Routledge, 2002.(With Kim Phillips)

Authored
 The World of the Muggletonians, Temple Smith, 1983. (With Christopher Hill and William Lamont) 
 The Quakers and the English Revolution, St. Martin's, 1985.
 The Last Rising of the Agricultural Labourers: Rural Life and Protest in Nineteenth-Century England, Oxford University Press, 1990.
 Microhistories: Demography, Society, and Culture in Rural England, 1800-1930, Cambridge University Press, 1996.
 Popular Cultures in England, 1550-1750, Longman, 1998.
 Watching Hannah: Sexuality, Horror and Bodily Deformation in Victorian England, Reaktion, 2002.
 Rural Englands: Labouring Lives in the Nineteenth Century, Palgrave, 2004.
 New York Hustlers: Masculinity and Sex in Modern America, Manchester University Press, 2010.
 Sex before Sexuality: A Premodern History, Polity Press, 2011. (With Kim Phillips)
 Sex Addiction: A Critical History, Polity Press, 2015. (With Nina Attwood and Claire Gooder) 
 Sex in the Archives: Writing American Sexual Histories. Manchester University Press, 2018.
 Trans America: A Counter-History. Polity Press, 2020.

References

Living people
1950 births
Academic staff of the University of Auckland